Fran Whelan (born 1937) is an Irish retired hurler who played as a right wing-back for club side Eoghan Ruadh and at inter-county level with the Dublin senior hurling team.

Honours

Dublin
Leinster Senior Hurling Championship (1): 1961

References

1937 births
Living people
Dublin inter-county hurlers